The AB postcode area, also known as the Aberdeen postcode area  is a group of 33 postcode districts in north-east Scotland, within 24 post towns. These cover the Aberdeen council area (including the city of Aberdeen, Milltimber and Peterculter), Aberdeenshire (including Banff, Macduff, Fraserburgh, Peterhead, Ellon, Turriff, Huntly, Insch, Inverurie, Westhill, Alford, Strathdon, Ballater, Aboyne, Banchory, Laurencekirk and Stonehaven) and east Moray (including Buckie, Keith, Aberlour and Ballindalloch).



Coverage
The approximate coverage of the postcode districts:

|-
! AB10
| ABERDEEN
| Bridge of Dee, Mannofield, Ruthrieston
| Aberdeen
|-
! AB11
| ABERDEEN
| Ferryhill, Torry
| Aberdeen 
|-
! AB12
| ABERDEEN
| Altens, Ardoe, Banchory Devenick, Blairs, Bridge of Dee, Cove Bay, Kincorth, Maryculter, Nigg, Portlethen, Tullos
| Aberdeen, Aberdeenshire
|-
! AB13
| MILLTIMBER
| Milltimber
| Aberdeen
|-
! AB14
| PETERCULTER
| Peterculter, Upper Anguston
| Aberdeen
|-
! AB15
| ABERDEEN
| Bieldside, Craigiebuckler, Cults, Hazlehead, Kingswells, Mannofield, Milltimber, Summerhill
| Aberdeen 
|-
! AB16
| ABERDEEN
| Mastrick, Northfield, Middlefield, Cornhill, Shedocksley
| Aberdeen 
|-
! AB21
| ABERDEEN
| Blackburn, Bucksburn, Dyce, Fintray, Kinellar, Newmachar, Whiterashes
| Aberdeen, Aberdeenshire
|-
! AB22
| ABERDEEN
| Bridge of Don, Danestone, Grandholm, Persley
| Aberdeen 
|-
! AB23
| ABERDEEN
| Balmedie, Belhelvie, Bridge of Don, Potterton, Whitecairns
| Aberdeen, Aberdeenshire
|-
! AB24
| ABERDEEN
| Old Aberdeen, Woodside, Tillydrone, Seaton, Bedford
| Aberdeen 
|-
! AB25
| ABERDEEN
| Kittybrewster, Foresterhill, Rosemount, George Street
| Aberdeen 
|-
! AB30
| LAURENCEKIRK
| Laurencekirk, Fettercairn, Marykirk, North Water Bridge, Luthermuir, Phesbo, Glensaugh, Auchenblae, Fordoun, Scotston, Arbuthnott
| Aberdeenshire
|-
! AB31
| BANCHORY
| Banchory, Lumphanan, Torphins, Crathes
| Aberdeenshire
|-
! AB32
| WESTHILL
| Westhill, Kirkton of Skene, Echt
| Aberdeenshire
|-
! AB33
| ALFORD
| Alford, Muir of Fowlis, Towie
| Aberdeenshire
|-
! AB34
| ABOYNE
| Aboyne, Kincardine O'Neil, Dinnet
| Aberdeenshire
|-
! AB35
| BALLATER
| Ballater, Crathie, Braemar, Spittal of Glenmuick
| Aberdeenshire
|-
! AB36
| STRATHDON
| Strathdon, Corgarff
| Aberdeenshire
|-
! AB37
| BALLINDALLOCH
| Ballindalloch, Glenlivet, Tomintoul
| Moray
|-
! AB38
| ABERLOUR
| Aberlour, Craigellachie, Rothes
| Moray
|-
! AB39
| STONEHAVEN
| Stonehaven, Newtonhill
| Aberdeenshire
|-
! AB41
| ELLON
| Ellon, Tarves, Pitmedden, Udny
| Aberdeenshire
|-
! AB42
| PETERHEAD
| Peterhead, Hatton, St. Fergus
| Aberdeenshire
|-
! AB43
| FRASERBURGH
| Fraserburgh, Crimond
| Aberdeenshire
|-
! AB44
| MACDUFF
| Macduff
| Aberdeenshire
|-
! AB45
| BANFF
| Banff, Gardenstown, Cornhill, Portsoy, Whitehills
| Aberdeenshire
|-
! AB51
| INVERURIE
| Inverurie, Kemnay, Kintore, Oldmeldrum
| Aberdeenshire
|-
! AB52
| INSCH
| Insch, Culsalmond, Largie, Auchleven, Oyne, Old Rayne, Colpy, Leslie, Wrangham, Duncanstone, Mill of Boddam
| Aberdeenshire
|-
! AB53
| TURRIFF
| Turriff, Fyvie, New Deer
| Aberdeenshire
|-
! AB54
| HUNTLY
| Huntly, Aberchirder, Cabrach, Cairnie, Forgue, Gartly, Glass, Kennethmont, Lumsden, Rhynie, Rothiemay
| Aberdeenshire, Moray
|-
! AB55
| KEITH
| Keith, Dufftown
| Moray
|-
! AB56
| BUCKIE
| Buckie, Cullen, Portknockie, Findochty, Portessie, Portgordon
| Moray
|-
! style="background:#FFFFFF;"|AB99
| style="background:#FFFFFF;"|ABERDEEN
| style="background:#FFFFFF;"|
| style="background:#FFFFFF;"|non-geographic
|}
Originally, the area had only five postcode districts, AB1 to AB5. In August 1990, these were recoded with the addition of second digits, such that every post town besides Aberdeen had its own district. At the same time, IV33, IV34 and IV35 were recoded as part of AB38.

Map

See also
List of postcode areas in the United Kingdom
Postcode Address File

References

External links
Royal Mail's Postcode Address File (PAF)
A quick introduction to Royal Mail's Postcode Address File (PAF)

Postcode areas covering Scotland